Coins (formerly Coins: The Magazine of Coin Collecting) is an American monthly numismatic publication.

History
Coins magazine was founded by Chester L. Krause in 1955 and was called Coin Press. Originally published in Iola, Wisconsin, by Krause Publications from 1955-2002, it was absorbed into F+W Media, which published the magazine from 2002-2019. In September 2019 it was acquired by Active Interest Media. Then the magazine became part of Active Interest Media's Home Group, based in Des Moines, Iowa.

Along with COINage, it was one of the top numismatic magazines by circulation, with 100,000 subscribers as of October 2009.

Content
Each issue features articles related to coin and paper money collecting, numismatics, investing, the history of the hobby and of coins in general, as well as tips on collecting and a “coin finds” column, where readers can write to discuss any interesting coins found in circulation. In addition, the magazine features several pages of coin values for coins of obsolete denominations such as the half cent, to modern coinage, as well as commemorative coins and proof sets. R.W. Julian is a regular contributor.

Each month, the magazine focuses on specific coins or series, such as Barber dimes, or Susan B. Anthony dollars. In addition, it occasionally features reviews of recent numismatic books, and a “market watch” column that tracks bullion values.

Regular Columns
In addition to the monthly feature stories, each issue contains regular columns, including:

Coin Finds — In which readers can write or email to talk about Coins they have recently found in circulation.

Market Watch — Tracking the values of bullion such as gold, silver, and platinum.

Basics and Beyond — A column focusing on Dr. Mike Thorne's recent pickups and show experiences, as well as occasional reviews of numismatic books.

Grading Standards — A coin grading column.

Bargain Collector — Focusing on some of the best "bang for your buck" coins in the hobby.

Distribution Channels
Coins is carried by Barnes & Noble in their periodical section.

References

1955 establishments in Wisconsin
Hobby magazines published in the United States
Monthly magazines published in the United States
Magazines established in 1955
Magazines published in Wisconsin
Numismatics journals
Magazines published in Iowa
Mass media in Des Moines, Iowa